Mike Ramos may refer to:
 Mike Ramos (decathlete)
 Mike Ramos (footballer)
 Michael A. Ramos, American attorney

See also
 Myke Ramos, Brazilian footballer